A planetary-mass moon is a planetary-mass object that is also a natural satellite. They are large and ellipsoidal (sometimes spherical) in shape. Two moons in the Solar System are larger than the planet Mercury (though less massive): Ganymede and Titan, and seven are larger and more massive than the dwarf planet . 

The concept of satellite planets – the idea that planetary-mass objects, including planetary-mass moons, are planets – is used by some planetary scientists, such as Alan Stern, who are more concerned with whether a celestial body has planetary geology (that is, whether it is a planetary body) than its solar or non-solar orbit (planetary dynamics). This conceptualization of planets as three classes of objects (classical planets, dwarf planets and satellite planets) has not been accepted by the International Astronomical Union (the IAU). In addition, the IAU definition of 'hydrostatic equilibrium' is quite restrictive – that the object's mass is sufficient for gravity to overcome rigid-body forces to become plastic –. In contrast, planetary-mass moons may be in hydrostatic equilibrium due to tidal or radiogenic heating, in some cases forming a subsurface ocean.

Early history
The distinction between a satellite and a classical planet was not recognized until after the heliocentric model of the Solar System was established. When in 1610 Galileo discovered the first satellites of another planet (the four Galilean moons of Jupiter), he referred to them as "four planets flying around the star of Jupiter at unequal intervals and periods with wonderful swiftness." Similarly, Christiaan Huygens, upon discovering Saturn's largest moon Titan in 1655, employed the terms "planeta" (planet), "Stella" (star), "luna" (moon), and the more modern "satellite" (attendant) to describe it. Giovanni Cassini, in announcing his discovery of Saturn's moons Iapetus and Rhea in 1671 and 1672, described them as Nouvelles Planetes autour de Saturne ("New planets around Saturn"). However, when the Journal de Scavans reported Cassini's discovery of two new Saturnian moons (Tethys and Dione) in 1686, it referred to them strictly as "satellites", though sometimes to Saturn as the "primary planet". When William Herschel announced his discovery of two objects in orbit around Uranus (Titania and Oberon) in 1787, he referred to them as "satellites" and "secondary planets". All subsequent reports of natural satellite discoveries used the term "satellite" exclusively, though the 1868 book Smith's Illustrated Astronomy referred to satellites as "secondary planets".

Modern concept

In the modern era, Alan Stern considers satellite planets to be one of three categories of planets, along with dwarf planets and classical planets. The term planemo ("planetary-mass object") covers all three populations.
Stern's and the IAU's definition of 'planet' depends on hydrostatic equilibrium – on the body's mass being sufficient to render it plastic, so that it relaxes into an ellipsoid under its own gravity. The IAU definition specifies that the mass is great enough to overcome 'rigid-body forces', and it does not address objects that may be in hydrostatic equilibrium due to a subsurface ocean or (in the case of Io) due to magma caused by tidal heating. Many of the larger icy moons could have subsurface oceans. 

The seven largest moons are more massive than the dwarf planet Pluto, which is known to be in hydrostatic equilibrium. These seven are Earth's Moon, the four Galilean moons of Jupiter (Io, Europa, Ganymede and Callisto), and the largest moons of Saturn (Titan) and of Neptune (Triton). Ganymede and Titan are additionally larger than the planet Mercury, and Callisto is almost as large. All of these moons are ellipsoidal. That said, the two moons larger than Mercury have less than half its mass, and it is mass, along with composition and internal temperature, that determine whether a body is plastic enough to be in hydrostatic equilibrium. Io, Europa, Ganymede, Titan, and Triton are generally believed to be in hydrostatic equilibrium, but Earth's Moon is known not to be in hydrostatic equilibrium, and the situation for Callisto is unclear.

Another dozen moons are ellipsoidal as well, indicating that they achieved equilibrium at some point in their histories. However, it has been shown that some of these moons are no longer in equilibrium, due to them becoming increasingly rigid as they cooled over time. Dysnomia's shape is not known, but it appears to be dense enough that it must have collapsed to form a solid body.

Neptune's second-largest moon Proteus has occasionally been included by authors discussing or advocating geophysical conceptions of the 'planet'. It is larger than Mimas but is quite far from being round.

Current equilibrium moons
Determining whether a moon is currently in hydrostatic equilibrium requires close observation, and is easier to disprove than to prove. 

Earth's entirely rocky moon solidified out of equilibrium billions of years ago, but most of the other six moons larger than Pluto, four of which are predominantly icy, are assumed to still be in equilibrium. (Ice has less tensile strength than rock, and is deformed at lower pressures and temperatures than rock.) The evidence is perhaps strongest for Ganymede, which has a magnetic field that indicates the fluid movement of electrically conducting material in its interior, though whether that fluid is a metallic core or a subsurface ocean is unknown.
One of the mid-sized moons of Saturn (Rhea) may also be in equilibrium, 
as may a couple of the moons of Uranus (Titania and Oberon).
However, the other ellipsoidal moons of Saturn (Mimas, Enceladus, Tethys, Dione and Iapetus) are no longer in equilibrium. In addition to not being in equilibrium, Mimas and Tethys have very low densities and it has been suggested that they may have non-negligible internal porosity, in which case they would not be satellite planets. The situation for Uranus's three smaller ellipsoidal moons (Umbriel,  Ariel and  Miranda) is unclear, as is that of Pluto's moon Charon. Eris' moon Dysnomia is larger than the three smallest ellipsoidal moons of Saturn and Uranus (Enceladus, Miranda, and Mimas), and must be quite massive to have tidally locked its parent; thus it has been included.

Orcus' moon Vanth has been included as a possibility; it is larger than Mimas but is about the same size as non-ellipsoidal Proteus (Neptune VIII, the second-largest moon of Neptune, diameter 420±14  km). Also included is Varda's moon Ilmarë, which within current uncertainties might be about the same size as Mimas.

List
 – believed to be in equilibrium
 – confirmed not to be in equilibrium
 – uncertain evidence

(Saturn VII is Hyperion, which is not gravitationally rounded; it is smaller than Mimas.)

Atmospheres

Titan has a denser atmosphere (1.4 bar) than Earth; it is the only known moon with a significant atmosphere. Triton (14 μbar), Io (1.9 ), and Callisto (26 ) have very thin atmospheres, but still enough to have collisions between atmospheric molecules. Other planetary-mass moons only have exospheres at most. Exospheres have been detected around Earth's Moon, Europa, Ganymede, Enceladus, Dione, and Rhea. An exosphere around Titania is a possibility, though it has not been confirmed.

See also
List of gravitationally rounded objects of the Solar System
List of Solar System objects by size

References

Planetary science
Planets
Moons
Lists of moons